The 2014 FIRS Women's Roller Hockey World Cup or Tourcoing 2014 was the 12th edition of the women's roller hockey world cup. It was held in Tourcoing, France from October 25 to November 1, 2014 and it was contested by fourteen teams. Argentina defeated France in the final to win the World Cup.

Group stage

Group A

Group B

Group C

Group D

Play-off stages

5th–8th playoff

9th–14th playoff

13th–14th playoff

Final ranking

See also
FIRS Women's Roller Hockey World Cup

External links
Official website
Fédération Internationale de Roller Sports

Women's Roller Hockey World Cup
International roller hockey competitions hosted by France
2014 FIRS Women's World Cup
Roller
World